Sarah Caravella (born May 31, 1979) is an American professional racing cyclist. She rides for team Pepper Palace p/b The Happy Tooth.

See also
 List of 2015 UCI Women's Teams and riders

References

External links
 

1979 births
Living people
American female cyclists
Place of birth missing (living people)
21st-century American women